Tihi or Teehe is a Gram Panchayat under sub-division Dr. Ambedkar Nagar (Mhow) in Indore district in the Indian state of Madhya Pradesh. Total geographical area of Tihi gram panchayat is 5.75 km2 (574.74 hectares). Mhowgaon is nearest town to Tihi which is approximately 8 km away.

Connectivity
The village is connected via road and nearest Town is Mhowgaon. There is no railway connectivity to the town. The nearest railway is station Mhow railway station which is 9 km away from the village. The nearest airport from the town is Indores Devi Ahilya Bai Holkar Airport, which is approximately 20 km away from the village.

Demographics
Tihi has a total population of 1,984 peoples and there are about 349 houses in village. 1,035 Males constitute 52.17% of the population and  949 females 47.83% (from 46% in 2001).Population of Children with age of 0–6 is 251 which is 12.65% of total population.

Climate
Tihi has a borderline humid subtropical climate (Köppen climate classification Cwa) and tropical savanna climate  (Aw). Three distinct seasons are observed: summer, monsoon and winter.

Summers start in mid-March and can be extremely hot in April and May. The daytime temperatures can touch  on more than one occasion. Average summer temperatures may go as high as  but humidity is very low.

Winters are moderate and usually dry. Lower temperatures can go as low as - on some nights. Usually the temperature ranges between 8 and 26 °C during winters.

Rains are due to southwest monsoons. The typical monsoon season goes from 15 June till mid-September, contributing 32–35 inches of annual rains. 95% of rains occur during monsoon season.

Tihi gets moderate rainfall of  during July–September due to the southwest monsoon.

Source: NOAA

See also
 Tihi railway station

References 

Villages in Indore district